TV9 Kannada is a 24-hours Kannada language entertainment channel in India. It was launched on 9 December 2006. The channel aires hourly news, analysis of major news events and interviews etc.

The news channel is owned by Associated Broadcasting Company Private Limited, Hyderabad which has news channels in Andhra Pradesh, Telangana, Gujarat, Maharashtra and other states.

On 9 December 2021, TV9 Kannada News Channel is now an HD channel after 15th anniversary of TV9 Kannada News Channel.

See also
List of Kannada-language television channels
Television in India
Media in Karnataka
Media of India

References

External links
 

Kannada-language television channels
24-hour television news channels in India
Television channels and stations established in 2006
TV9 Group
Television stations in Bangalore
2006 establishments in Karnataka